Mukesh Pandya is a member of the legislative assembly of the Indian state of Madhya Pradesh. He was elected to represent Badnagar in 2013 and belongs to the Bharatiya Janata Party.

References

Bharatiya Janata Party politicians from Madhya Pradesh
Living people
Madhya Pradesh MLAs 2013–2018
People from Ujjain district
Year of birth missing (living people)